The Seventh Deadly Sin is the seventh studio album by American rapper Ice-T. It was released on September 12, 1999 via Coroner Records/Roadrunner Records/Atomic Pop. Bazaro, Brother Marquis, Buckshot, CJ Mac, Deadly Threat, El Sadiq, Gripsta, King T, Marc Live, Numskull, Poppa LQ, Powerlord JEL, Radzay, Ras Kass, Slej Tha Ruffedge, Son Doobie, Tash and Top Gunz made their guest appearances on the album.

Track listing

References

1999 albums
Ice-T albums